Liancalus querulus is a species of long-legged fly in the family Dolichopodidae.

References

Hydrophorinae
Articles created by Qbugbot
Insects described in 1877
Taxa named by Carl Robert Osten-Sacken